The Women's Police Service (WPS) was a national voluntary organisation in the United Kingdom.

History

Formation
It was originally established as the Women Police Volunteers (WPV) in 1914 by Nina Boyle and Margaret Damer Dawson, who had met when Damer Dawson was working for the Criminal Law Amendment Committee in 1914. Before the First World War, campaigners for women's rights proposed that there should be female as well as male police officers, but the outbreak of war prevented any progress. Both Boyle and Damer Dawson observed the trouble faced in London by Belgian and French refugees in London after the initial German advance, particularly the danger of their being recruited for prostitution on arrival at railway stations They were also concerned about existing prostitutes loitering near railway stations used by the increasing number of servicemen passing through the capital.

The pair gained the approval of Sir Edward Henry, Commissioner of Police of the Metropolis to train women, who would then patrol London on a voluntary basis with the role of offering advice and support to women and children to help prevent sexual harassment and abuse.
 Nina Boyle led the organisation with Dawson as assistant. The volunteer women were allowed to officially patrol the streets of London and to assist women in need, with men of the Metropolitan Police and other forces asked to assist them. Boyle herself was one of the first women to appear in a police uniform.

Women's Police Service
Boyle's background was in the Women's Freedom League (WFL) and so for her the WPV was an opportunity for women to assist in catching criminals and to challenge male control of the practice of the law, particularly in relation to sexual issues - in other words an instrument to help and support women rather than to control their activities. However, Damer Dawson was more concerned with policing public morality, particularly that of working-class women - one of her pre-war campaigns had been against animal vivisection. The government agreed and from its foundation onwards the WPV's role was delimited to enforcing the Def914 and public decency and supervising female workers such as munitionettes. While this side of their work was generally approved, Boyle was to become alarmed that her organisation and other similar initiatives were being used to support anti-female propaganda and to curtail women's civil liberties. She also deplored the adoption of Regulation 40D, an anti-prostitution amendment to the Defence of the Realm Act, that in many people's view revived some of the objectionable features of the nineteenth-century Contagious Diseases Acts. She described Regulation 40D, which punished women for their sexual relations with members of the armed services, as 'besmirching' the good name of women.

In February 1915 Boyle and Damer Dawson fell out over the use of the WPV to enforce a curfew on women of so-called 'loose character' near a service base in Grantham, which proved unacceptable to Boyle and her beliefs. Boyle also denounced the use of the Defence of the Realm Act by the authorities in Cardiff to impose a curfew on what were described as 'women of a certain class' between the hours of 7 pm and 8 am. In contrast, Damer Dawson took a more pragmatic line, with the support of most of the WPV's members. Boyle asked for Dawson's resignation, but instead Dawson convened a meeting of 50 policewomen, all but two of whom agreed to follow Dawson's lead. Dawson changed the name of WPV to the Women Police Service, took on Mary Sophia Allen as her second-in-command and ended all links with the WFL.

While an organisation known as the WPV continued to patrol on its own terms in Brighton and part of London until 1916, Dawson's new service enjoyed much greater success. Its members searched women employed at Ministry of Munitions factories. In August 1915 in Grantham, Edith Smith of the WPS was appointed the first woman police constable in England with full power of arrest. The WPS's benevolent service also founded a babies' home in Kent, which after Dawson's death was renamed the "Damer Dawson Memorial Home for Babies". As the first uniformed women's police service, both the WPS and the WPV made progress in gaining acceptance of women's role in police work.

Post-war
As the first uniformed women's police services, the WPV and the WPS helped accustom the government and the British public to women exercising policing functions. However, it was the members of a third organization - the Voluntary Women Patrols of the National Union of Women Workers - who would be drawn upon in 1918-1919 for the first members of Britain's first official women's police force, the Metropolitan Police Women Patrols. The first twenty-three women recruited for these Patrols were drawn exclusively from the NUWW's patrolwomen, as was their senior officer Sofia Stanley, though later intakes did include former WPS volunteers. Damer Dawson requested to have all the WPS's volunteers made into official Met patrolwomen, but the Commissioner refused as he felt that it would cause friction because the women were too well educated. 

The WPS remained in existence even after the introduction of women into police forces such as the Metropolitan Police in 1919, with Allen taking over command after Damer Dawson's death in May 1920. This led to tensions which ultimately culminated in Allen and four other senior WPS patrolwomen being taken to court in March and April 1921 by the Metropolitan Police Commissioner for causing confusion by wearing a uniform too similar to that of the Met patrolwomen. This ended in a token fine, a renaming of the force to the Women's Auxiliary Service (WAS), an alteration to its cap badge and an addition of scarlet shoulder straps. WPS members had been sent to Ireland in 1920 during the Irish War of Independence to assist the Royal Irish Constabulary as "lady police searchers". and Allen's focus became increasingly international - for instance, she  represented the WAS on a visit to the British Army of the Rhine in 1923 to advise on the use of women police. She also assigned it strike-breaking duties during the 1926 General Strike.

Decline
When the Lord President of the Council Viscount Halifax set up the Women's Voluntary Services for Civil Defence in 1938, the WAS accepted a government invitation to be represented on the body's Advisory Council - Allen fulfilled this role until January 1940, when she stopped attending its meetings. It is unclear when WAS ceased to exist but it seems that this had occurred in a de facto sense by 1940 - when asked in the House of Commons on 12 June that year if the government would close down WAS, Osbert Peake, Under-Secretary at the Home Office, stated "It is extremely doubtful whether this so-called organisation has any corporate existence at the present time". From the 1940s onwards the phrase 'Women's Auxiliary Services' was used as a catch-all term for the Women's Auxiliary Air Force, Auxiliary Territorial Service, Women's Auxiliary Air Force, Land Army, nurses and other women in the armed services, rather than for Allen's organisation.

References

Bibliography
 Mary S. Allen, The Pioneer Policewoman, Chatto & Windus. London, 1925
 R.M. Douglas, Feminist Freikorps: The British Voluntary Women police, 1914-1940. Praeger Publishers, Westport. 1999
 Louise A. Jackson, Women Police. Gender, Welfare, and Surveillance in the Twentieth Century, Manchester University Press, 2006
 Phillipa Levine, '"Walking the Streets in a Way No Decent Woman Should": Women Police in World War I.', The Journal of Modern History 1994; 66(1):34-78
 Joan Lock, The British Policewoman. Her Story (Robert Hale, 1979).

1914 establishments in the United Kingdom
 
Women's organisations based in the United Kingdom
United Kingdom home front during World War I
Law enforcement in the United Kingdom
Women in law enforcement